Uralsky Trubnik is a bandy club from Pervouralsk that plays in the Russian Bandy Super League. After the indoor stadium Volga-Sport-Arena in Ulyanovsk was finished, Uralsky Trubnik was for a few years the only club in the highest division without artificial ice. That is until Murman got promoted for the 2018-19 season. However, a decision to build an indoor bandy stadium has been taken. In 2017 the team won the pre-season tournament ExTeCupen. In 2019 the club for the first time in its history took a medal in the domestic league with a third place.

Sources

External links
 Official club website (in Russian)
 Official telegram channel (in Russian)
 Official VK-page (in Russian)

Bandy clubs in Russia
Bandy clubs established in 1937
Sport in Sverdlovsk Oblast
Pervouralsk